Bleeker, formerly known as Bleeker Ridge, are a Canadian rock band from Orillia, Ontario, consisting of Taylor Perkins, Cole Perkins, Mike Vandyk and Chris Dimas.

History
Bleeker Ridge was formed by two sets of brothers: Taylor and Cole Perkins, and Dan and Dustin Steinke.  They came together in 2003 when all four met at a music shop in Orillia, Ontario, when Cole Perkins and Dan Steinke were 12 years old. They first started playing covers of Jimi Hendrix and Joe Walsh songs before releasing two independent CDs: Undertow (2004) and The Rain (2007). The band was scouted by various members of the music industry, but were often considered too young. Joe Kresta, an A&R director, saw the band in 2005 when he was with Universal Music Canada. Kresta said he was "totally amazed at what these 14-year-olds were doing, they had their shirts off, long hair and it was almost odd, these voices and that sound coming out of these little guys. There were guitar licks that you see guys three times their age doing, but I wasn't in A&R at the time, so I walked away thinking, 'Hey, that was really something special,' but they still hadn't found their own identity."

The band's name Bleeker Ridge is from the street names where the two sets of brothers lived: the Perkins' lived on Bleeker St. and the Steinke's lived on Ridge Ave.

The band later signed with Roadrunner Records. In the Summer of 2010, the band toured Canada with Airbourne as one of two opening acts, along with Social Code. They released the album Small Town Dead, produced by Bob Marlette, on September 21, 2010 in Canada. The first single from the album was the title track "Small Town Dead". The song charted on the Canadian Active Rock Charts, reaching the top 10.
In Spring 2011, Bleeker Ridge performed on the Canadian leg of the Jagermiester Music tour alongside My Darkest Days, Papa Roach, and Buckcherry.

They also released "You Would've Liked It" and "Sick of You" as singles in 2011.

Mike Vandyk, "Dutch", joined the band shortly after the album's release. Mike had been a session/recording & tour bassist for the band.

In April 2013, Bleeker Ridge released "Last Cigarette" as a single from their soon to be released album "Four", followed by "Go Home" a few months later. June 4, 2013, Bleeker Ridge's album "Four" was released.

After completing the recording of their new album with James Michael, who along with Nikki Sixx and DJ Ashba form the band Sixx:A.M., Dustin was asked to play drums for them on their Japanese debut at the Nippon Budokan on February 19, 2015 as part of VampPark Fest hosted by the rock band Vamps. After a successful show in Japan, they asked him to play drums on their first tour, the Modern Vintage Tour.

In January 2016, Dustin left the band and signed on with Sixx:A.M., and Bleeker Ridge changed their name to Bleeker. Dan left the band a few months later.

In 2017, Bleeker was nominated for Breakthrough Group of the Year at the Juno Awards.

Band members
Current members
 Taylor Perkins – lead vocals (2003–present)
 Cole Perkins – lead guitar, backing vocals (2003–present)
 Mike Vandyk – bass guitar (2003– present)
 Chris Dimas – drums, (2016–present)

Past members
 Dustin Steinke – drums, backing vocals (2003– 2016)
 Dan Steinke – guitar, backing vocals (2003– 2016)

Discography

Studio albums

Singles

Music videos

Juno Awards
The Juno Awards are presented by the Canadian Academy of Recording Arts and Sciences. Bleeker has received one nomination.

|-
|rowspan="3"| 2017 || Bleeker || Breakthrough Group of the Year ||

See also

Canadian rock
Music of Canada

References

External links
 Bleeker

Musical groups established in 2003
Musical quartets
Canadian post-grunge groups
Musical groups from Ontario
2003 establishments in Ontario